The second USS Hornet, was a single-masted, wooden-hulled sailing sloop-of-war of the United States Navy  that saw service in the First Barbary War in the Mediterranean Sea along the shores of North Africa. The ship was formerly the merchant ship Traveller of Massachusetts and was purchased at Malta by the U.S. Navy to join in the American blockade at Tripoli.

First Barbary War
In April 1805, during the First Barbary War the Hornet with Lieutenant Samuel Evans in command, sailed for the Mediterranean Sea to join the American fleet blockading the harbor at Tripoli, joining up with the ships Argus and Nautilus The Hornet was to accompany the Argus to take supplies and money to meet Eaton and his land expedition at Bomba and to later join up with the fleet, commanded by Commodore John Rodgers in the bombardment of Derna and later Tripoli. Her bombardment in company with Argus and Nautilus on 27 April 1805 helped force the surrender of Derna to a land expedition bringing pressure to bear on the besieged port of Tripoli, where the Pasha soon accepted terms of peace.

After helping to evacuate the expedition from Derna, Hornet joined the fleet in a show of strength off Tunis and other Barbary ports. This was effective in quelling threats of piratical acts against merchant shipping in the Mediterranean. Hornet continued patrols to insure safety of American commerce in the Mediterranean until 3 June 1806. After riding out a severe gale that carried away her top mast, she arrived in Philadelphia on 9 August. Hornet was decommissioned and sold at Philadelphia on 3 September 1806.

See also
List of sailing frigates of the United States Navy
List of sloops of war of the United States Navy

Notes

References

Bibliography
 Url1 Url2
 Url

1805 ships
Sloops of the United States Navy